Manuel Antonio Rueda González  (27 August 1921 in Monte Cristi Province; † 20 December 1999 in Santo Domingo ) was a Dominican writer and pianist.

Rueda studied at the Liceo Musical at María Luisa Nanita and [[Oliva Pichardo De Marchena
]] and was later a student of Manuela Jiménez. He continued his education at the Rosita Renard's Conservatory in Santiago de Chile and, together with Armando Palacios Bate, undertook a concert tour through South America, after which he finished with the Premio Orrego Carvallo excellent.

When he returned to the Dominican Republic after fourteen years, he became director of the Liceo Musical Pablo Claudio in San Cristóbal and later became a piano professor at the Conservatorio de Santo Domingo. At the Interamericano de Música Festival in 1972, he played with the Orquesta Sinfónica Nacional de la República Dominicana George Gershwin Piano Concerto in F .

In addition, Rueda was a member of the Instituto de Investigaciones folklóricas of the Universidad Nacional Pedro Henríquez Ureña. In 1974, he founded the avant-garde literary movement of Pluralism (philosophy) alongside Miguel Vila Luna, who expanded it in architectonics. He was a member of the Academia Dominicana de la Lengua, a member of the Facultad de Ciencias y Artes Musicales of the Universidad de Chile, and was a recipient of the Order of Merit of Duarte, Sánchez and Mella. Rueda won the Premio Annual de Literatura ("Annual Literature Award") six times, and in 1995 he won the Premio Teatral Tirso de Molina.

Rueda's pupils included Margarita Luna de Espaillat.

Works 
  Las noches , poems, 1949, 1953
  Tríptico , poems, 1949
 La trinitaria blanca, Drama, 1957
 La criatura terrestre, poems, 1963
  Teatro , Drama, 1968
  Adivinanzas dominicanas , eds, 1968
 Conocimiento y poesía en el folklore, Essays, 1971
 Antología panorámica de la poesía dominicana 1912-1962, edited by Lupo Hernández Rueda, 1972
 Por los mares de la dama, poems, 1976
 Las edades del viento, poems, 1979
 El Rey Clinejas, Drama, 1979
 Papeles de Sara y otros relatos, narrations, 1985
 De Tierra morena vengo (with Ramón Francisco, the photographer Wilfredo García and the painter Ramón Oviedo)
  Congregación del cuerpo único , poems, 1989
 Retablo de la pasión y muerte de Juana la Loca, Drama, 1996
  Bienvenida y la noche , novel, 1995
  Dos siglos de literatura dominicana (see XIX y XX). Poesía y prosa ', edited by José Alcántara Almánzar, 1996
  Las metamorfosis de Makandal '', 1998

Sources 

 El Tren de Yaguaramas - Manuel Rueda
 Isla Ternura - Manuel Rueda
 Literatura.us: ¿Quién es Manuel Rueda?
 Poetas Dominicanos: Manuel Rueda (1921-1999)
 Escritores Dominicanos: Manuel Rueda

Music educators
1921 births
1999 deaths
People from Monte Cristi Province
Dominican Republic pianists
20th-century Dominican Republic poets
20th-century male writers
Dominican Republic male poets
Order of Merit of Duarte, Sánchez and Mella
Academic staff of Universidad Nacional Pedro Henríquez Ureña
20th-century pianists